{{DISPLAYTITLE:E=MC2 (song)}}

"E=MC2" is a 1986 single by English band Big Audio Dynamite, released as the second single from their debut studio album This Is Big Audio Dynamite (1985). The song was the band's first Top 40 hit on the UK Singles Chart, peaking at number 11. Additionally, it peaked at number 37 on the Billboard Hot Dance Club Play chart in the United States. The song features prominent dialogue samples from the 1970 film Performance. The song is also played during the opening titles of the French movie Forces spéciales (2011).

History

This song was inspired by the films of Nicolas Roeg, including Performance (1970; written and co-directed by Donald Cammell), Walkabout (1971), Don't Look Now (1973), The Man Who Fell to Earth (1976), and Insignificance (1985). Its lyrics refer directly to many of them. For example:

The last four lines of the first verse "Man dies first reel / People ask what's the deal? / This ain't how it's supposed to be / Don't like no Aborigine" are a reference to the 1971 film Walkabout, which begins with an adult character committing suicide, which then leaves two children to survive a trek across the Australian outback, aided by a young Aborigine male.
 The second verse (from "Took a trip to Powis Square" to "Insanity Bohemian style") refers to the two main characters in Performance (1970): a retired rock star (played by Mick Jagger) and a gangster on the run (played by James Fox)
 "King of brains" – refers to Albert Einstein, a lead character in Insignificance (1985)
 "Queen of the sack" – refers to Marilyn Monroe, a lead character in Insignificance (1985)
 "Hall of fame baseball" – refers to Joe DiMaggio, a lead character in Insignificance (1985)
 "Senator's a hoodlum" – refers to Joseph McCarthy, a lead character in Insignificance (1985)
 "Space guy fell from the sky" – refers to The Man Who Fell to Earth (1976) starring David Bowie
 The second verse (from "Met a dwarf who was no good" to "Gets to take the funeral ride") describes Don't Look Now (1973), starring Donald Sutherland.

Included throughout the song are dialogue samples from Performance (1970).

Music video
The music video for the song (directed by Don Letts) features clips from films made by Nicolas Roeg, coupled with scenes of the band performing in a mine.

Mick Jones and Hard-Fi
Indie rock band Hard-Fi have performed "E=MC2" live, being joined by Big Audio Dynamite's lead vocalist Mick Jones on occasion. One such performance was at the Brixton Academy on 15 May 2006, a gig at which Billy Bragg and Paul Weller also appeared. On 18 May 2006, Hard-Fi were again joined onstage by Jones one song into their three-song encore for their final performance of "E=MC2".

Track listing
7" CBS / A 6963 (UK)
 "E=MC2" – 4:30
 "This Is Big Audio Dynamite" – 3:39

7" Columbia / 38-06053 (US)
 "E=MC2" – 4:30
 "A Party" – 4:44

12" CBS / TA 6963 (UK)
 "E=MC2 (Extended Remix)" – 6:18 (remixed by Paul 'Groucho' Smykle)
 "This Is Big Audio Dynamite" – 5:53

12" Columbia / 44-05909 (US)
 "E=MC2 (Extended Remix)" – 5:33 (remixed by Bert Bevans)
 "A Party" – 10:15 (remixed by Paul 'Groucho' Smykle)

Chart positions

References

External links
 

1985 songs
1986 singles
Big Audio Dynamite songs
Songs written by Mick Jones (The Clash)
Song recordings produced by Mick Jones (The Clash)
CBS Records singles
Songs written by Don Letts
Songs based on speech samples